1 (one, unit, unity) is a number representing a single or the only entity. 1 is also a numerical digit and represents a single unit of counting or measurement. For example, a line segment of unit length is a line segment of length 1. In conventions of sign where zero is considered neither positive nor negative, 1 is the first and smallest positive integer. It is also sometimes considered the first of the infinite sequence of natural numbers, followed by 2, although by other definitions 1 is the second natural number, following 0.

The fundamental mathematical property of 1 is to be a multiplicative identity, meaning that any number multiplied by 1 equals the same number. Most if not all properties of 1 can be deduced from this. In advanced mathematics, a multiplicative identity is often denoted 1, even if it is not a number. 1 is by convention not considered a prime number; this was not universally accepted until the mid-20th century. Additionally, 1 is the smallest possible difference between two distinct natural numbers.

The unique mathematical properties of the number have led to its unique uses in other fields, ranging from science to sports. It commonly denotes the first, leading, or top thing in a group.

As a word 
One is most commonly a determiner used with singular countable nouns, as in one day at a time. One is also a pronoun used to refer to an unspecified person or to people in general as in one should take care of oneself. Finally, one is a noun when it refers to the number one as in one plus one is two and when it is used as a pro form, as in the green one is nice or those ones look good.

Etymology 
One comes from the English word an, which comes from the Proto-Germanic root . The Proto-Germanic root  comes from the Proto-Indo-European root *oi-no-.

Compare the Proto-Germanic root  to Old Frisian an, Gothic ains, Danish en, Dutch een, German eins and Old Norse einn.

Compare the Proto-Indo-European root *oi-no- (which means "one, single") to Greek oinos (which means "ace" on dice), Latin unus (one), Old Persian , Old Church Slavonic -inu and ino-, Lithuanian vienas, Old Irish oin and Breton un (one).

As a number 
One, sometimes referred to as unity, is the first non-zero natural number. It is thus the integer after zero.

Any number multiplied by one remains that number, as one is the identity for multiplication. As a result, 1 is its own factorial, its own square and square root, its own cube and cube root, and so on. One is also the result of the empty product, as any number multiplied by one is itself. It is also the only natural number that is neither composite nor prime with respect to division, but is instead considered a unit (meaning of ring theory).

As a digit 

The glyph used today in the Western world to represent the number 1, a vertical line, often with a serif at the top and sometimes a short horizontal line at the bottom, traces its roots back to the Brahmic script of ancient India, where it was a simple vertical line. It was transmitted to Europe via the Maghreb and Andalusia during the Middle Ages, through scholarly works written in Arabic.

In some countries, the serif at the top is sometimes extended into a long upstroke, sometimes as long as the vertical line, which can lead to confusion with the glyph used for seven in other countries. In styles in which the digit 1 is written with a long upstroke, the digit 7 is often written with a horizontal stroke through the vertical line, to disambiguate them. Styles that do not use the long upstroke on digit 1 usually do not use the horizontal stroke through the vertical of the digit 7 either.

Many older typewriters lack a separate key for 1, using the lowercase letter l or uppercase I instead. It is possible to find cases when the uppercase J is used, though it may be for decorative purposes. In some typefaces, different glyphs are used for I and 1, but the numeral 1 resembles a small caps version of I, with parallel serifs at top and bottom, with the capital I being full-height.

Mathematics

Definitions
Mathematically, 1 is:
in arithmetic (algebra) and calculus, the natural number that follows 0 and the multiplicative identity element of the integers, real numbers and complex numbers;
more generally, in algebra, the multiplicative identity (also called unity), usually of a group or a ring.

Formalizations of the natural numbers have their own representations of 1. In the Peano axioms, 1 is the successor of 0. In Principia Mathematica, it is defined as the set of all singletons (sets with one element), and in the Von Neumann cardinal assignment of natural numbers, it is defined as the set {0}.

In a multiplicative group or monoid, the identity element is sometimes denoted 1, but e (from the German Einheit, "unity") is also traditional. However, 1 is especially common for the multiplicative identity of a ring, i.e., when an addition and 0 are also present. When such a ring has characteristic n not equal to 0, the element called 1 has the property that  (where this 0 is the additive identity of the ring). Important examples are finite fields.

By definition, 1 is the magnitude, absolute value, or norm of a unit complex number, unit vector, and a unit matrix (more usually called an identity matrix). Note that the term unit matrix is sometimes used to mean something quite different.

By definition, 1 is the probability of an event that is absolutely or almost certain to occur.

In category theory, 1 is sometimes used to denote the terminal object of a category.

In number theory, 1 is the value of Legendre's constant, which was introduced in 1808 by Adrien-Marie Legendre in expressing the asymptotic behavior of the prime-counting function. Legendre's constant was originally conjectured to be approximately 1.08366, but was proven to equal exactly 1 in 1899.

Properties
Tallying is often referred to as "base 1", since only one mark – the tally itself – is needed. This is more formally referred to as a unary numeral system. Unlike base 2 or base 10, this is not a positional notation.

Since the base 1 exponential function (1x) always equals 1, its inverse does not exist (which would be called the logarithm base 1 if it did exist).

In many mathematical and engineering problems, numeric values are typically normalized to fall within the unit interval from 0 to 1, where 1 usually represents the maximum possible value in the range of parameters. Likewise, vectors are often normalized into unit vectors (i.e., vectors of magnitude one), because these often have more desirable properties. Functions, too, are often normalized by the condition that they have integral one, maximum value one, or square integral one, depending on the application.

Because of the multiplicative identity, if f(x) is a multiplicative function, then f(1) must be equal to 1.

There are two ways to write the real number 1 as a recurring decimal: as 1.000..., and as 0.999.... 1 is the first figurate number of every kind, such as triangular number, pentagonal number and centered hexagonal number, to name just a few.

1 is also the first and second number in the Fibonacci sequence (0 being the zeroth) and is the first number in many other mathematical sequences.

The definition of a field requires that 1 must not be equal to 0. Thus, there are no fields of characteristic 1. Nevertheless, abstract algebra can consider the field with one element, which is not a singleton and is not a set at all.

1 is the most common leading digit in many sets of data, a consequence of Benford's law.

1 is the only known Tamagawa number for a simply connected algebraic group over a number field.

The generating function that has all coefficients equal to 1 is a geometric series, given by

The zeroth metallic mean is 1, with the golden section equal to the continued fraction [1;1,1,...], and the infinitely nested square root  

The series of unit fractions that most rapidly converge to 1 are the reciprocals of Sylvester's sequence, which generate the infinite Egyptian fraction

Primality

1 is by convention neither a prime number nor a composite number, but a unit (meaning of ring theory) like −1 and, in the Gaussian integers, i and −i. 

The fundamental theorem of arithmetic guarantees unique factorization over the integers only up to units. For example, but if units are included, is also equal to, say,  among infinitely many similar "factorizations".

1 appears to meet the naïve definition of a prime number, being evenly divisible only by 1 and itself (also 1). As such, some mathematicians considered it a prime number as late as the middle of the 20th century, but mathematical consensus has generally and since then universally been to exclude it for a variety of reasons (such as complicating the fundamental theorem of arithmetic and other theorems related to prime numbers). 

1 is the only positive integer divisible by exactly one positive integer, whereas prime numbers are divisible by exactly two positive integers, composite numbers are divisible by more than two positive integers, and zero is divisible by all positive integers.

Table of basic calculations

In technology 

 The resin identification code used in recycling to identify polyethylene terephthalate.
The ITU country code for the North American Numbering Plan area, which includes the United States, Canada, and parts of the Caribbean.
A binary code is a sequence of 1 and 0 that is used in computers for representing any kind of data.
In many physical devices, 1 represents the value for "on", which means that electricity is flowing.
The numerical value of true in many programming languages.
1 is the ASCII code of "Start of Header".

In science 
Dimensionless quantities are also known as quantities of dimension one.
1 is the atomic number of hydrogen.
+1 is the electric charge of positrons and protons.
Group 1 of the periodic table consists of the alkali metals.
Period 1 of the periodic table consists of just two elements, hydrogen and helium.
The dwarf planet Ceres has the minor-planet designation 1 Ceres because it was the first asteroid to be discovered.
The Roman numeral I often stands for the first-discovered satellite of a planet or minor planet (such as Neptune I, a.k.a. Triton). For some earlier discoveries, the Roman numerals originally reflected the increasing distance from the primary instead.

In philosophy 
In the philosophy of Plotinus (and that of other neoplatonists), The One is the ultimate reality and source of all existence. Philo of Alexandria (20 BC – AD 50) regarded the number one as God's number, and the basis for all numbers ("De Allegoriis Legum," ii.12 [i.66]).

The Neopythagorean philosopher Nicomachus of Gerasa affirmed that one is not a number, but the source of number. He also believed the number two is the embodiment of the origin of otherness. His number theory was recovered by Boethius in his Latin translation of Nicomachus's treatise Introduction to Arithmetic.

In sports 
In many professional sports, the number 1 is assigned to the player who is first or leading in some respect, or otherwise important; the number is printed on his sports uniform or equipment. This is the pitcher in baseball, the goalkeeper in association football (soccer), the starting fullback in most of rugby league, the starting loosehead prop in rugby union and the previous year's world champion in Formula One. 1 may be the lowest possible player number, like in the American–Canadian National Hockey League (NHL) since the 1990s or in American football.

In other fields 
Number One is Royal Navy informal usage for the chief executive officer of a ship, the captain's deputy responsible for discipline and all normal operation of a ship and its crew.
1 is the value of an ace in many playing card games, such as cribbage.
List of highways numbered 1
List of public transport routes numbered 1
1 is often used to denote the Gregorian calendar month of January.
1 CE, the first year of the Common Era
01, the former dialling code for Greater London (now 020)
For Pythagorean numerology (a pseudoscience), the number 1 is the number that means beginning, new beginnings, new cycles, it is a unique and absolute number.
PRS One, a German paraglider design
+1 is the code for international telephone calls to countries in the North American Numbering Plan.
 In some countries, a street address of "1" is considered prestigious and developers will attempt to obtain such an address for a building, to the point of lobbying for a street or portion of a street to be renamed, even if this makes the address less useful for wayfinding. The construction of a new street to serve the development may also provide the possibility of a "1" address. An example of such an address is the Apple Campus, located at 1 Infinite Loop, Cupertino, California.

See also 

−1
+1 (disambiguation)
List of mathematical constants
One (word)
Root of unity
List of highways numbered 1

References

External links 

The Number 1
The Positive Integer 1
Prime curiosities: 1

 
Integers